Digitorum longus muscle may refer to:

 Extensor digitorum longus muscle
 Flexor digitorum longus muscle